is a Japanese actor. He was nominated for Best Supporting Actor at the 32nd Japan Academy Prize for Aibō The Movie.

Selected filmography

Film
 Mangetsu no Kuchizuke (1989)
 Kinako (2011)
 Samurai Hustle (2014)
 My Love Story!! (2015)
 The Magnificent Nine (2016)
 Samurai Hustle Returns (2016)
 Recall (2018)
 My Dad is a Heel Wrestler (2018)
 The 47 Ronin in Debt (2019)
 Extro (2020), Himself
 Blue Heaven wo Kimi ni (2020)
 Food Luck (2020)
 Nukero Moebius! (2023)
 Kono Chiisana Te (2023)

Theatre
 My Fair Lady - Professor Henry Higgins (2013-2018)

Television
 AIBOU: Tokyo Detective Duo (2000–2022, season 1–7, and 21), Kaoru Kameyama
 Ohisama (2011)
 Ru: Taiwan Express (2020)
 North Light (2020)
 Ranman (2023), Rankō Ikeda

References

External links 
 
 

1962 births
People from Sakai, Osaka
Japanese male actors
Living people
Amuse Inc. talents